Luis Manuel Villa López (born 11 August 1989), commonly known as Luisma, is a Spanish footballer who plays as a midfielder for SD Leioa.

Club career
Born in Noja, Cantabria, Luisma came through the youth system at Racing de Santander. He was mainly registered with the B team during his three-year spell with the club, appearing in three La Liga matches as a substitute in three different seasons; his debut in the competition came on 1 September 2007, when he played five minutes after replacing Gonzalo Colsa in a 1–1 away draw against Real Zaragoza.

Released in 2010, Luisma took his game to Segunda División B, where he represented in quick succession Real Unión, Deportivo Alavés, SD Amorebieta and SD Noja. He reached the promotion playoffs to Segunda División with the first and third sides, but consecutively fell short.

In late July 2013, Luisma went on trial at Barnet in the Conference Premier alongside compatriot Roberto Casabella. Both players had their signings confirmed on 3 August, and the former's first goal came on 2 November 2013 when he scored the game's only in a home win over Kidderminster Harriers, being also later sent off for two bookable offences.

Across his two seasons at Barnet, Luisma scored 17 goals in 67 games in all competitions. In his second season, he finished as the team's second top scorer and helped them win promotion to The Football League as champions. On 2 July 2015, he left by mutual consent as he wanted to move back to Spain, writing a farewell letter to fans on his departure.

Luisma joined Arenas Club de Getxo on 15 July 2015. After three seasons, he then had a short spell with SD Ponferradina also of the third tier.

In January 2019, Luisma signed with Indian Super League club Bengaluru FC until the end of the season. He returned to Spain one year later, agreeing to a deal at amateurs Sestao River Club. 

Luisma continued competing in the Spanish lower leagues until his retirement, with Gernika Club and SD Leioa.

Club statistics

Honours
Barnet
Conference Premier: 2014–15

Bengaluru
Indian Super League: 2018–19

References

External links

1989 births
Living people
Spanish footballers
Footballers from Cantabria
Association football midfielders
La Liga players
Segunda División B players
Tercera División players
Tercera Federación players
Rayo Cantabria players
Racing de Santander players
Real Unión footballers
Deportivo Alavés players
SD Amorebieta footballers
Arenas Club de Getxo footballers
SD Ponferradina players
Sestao River footballers
Gernika Club footballers
SD Leioa players
National League (English football) players
Barnet F.C. players
Indian Super League players
Bengaluru FC players
Spanish expatriate footballers
Expatriate footballers in England
Expatriate footballers in India
Spanish expatriate sportspeople in England
Spanish expatriate sportspeople in India